The Madras Railway (full name Madras Railway Company) played a pioneering role in developing railways in southern India and was merged in 1908 with Southern Mahratta Railway to form Madras and Southern Mahratta Railway.

The Madras Railway was formed in 1845 and its first track from Royapuram in Chennai (then known as Madras) to Arcot was opened in 1856. It had as its objective, connection of Chennai on the east coast with the west coast, as also linking up with Bengaluru and the Nilgiris, and to link up with the line from Mumbai.

1857 from Walaja Road to Cuddalore route was proposed via Katpadi. The link with the west coast was first established in 1862 with a line to Beypore, which served as the western terminus of Madras Railway. The western terminus was shifted to Kozikode (then known as Calicut) in 1888. The link between Jolarpettai, a station on the Chennai-Beypore line of Madras Railway, and Bangalore Cantt. was established in 1864.

In 1871, Madras Railway extension up to Raichur was linked with an extension of Great Indian Peninsula Railway from Kalyan to Raichur, thereby establishing Chennai-Mumbai link. The Chennai-Vijayawada link was established in 1899, thereby paving the way for opening of the Howrah-Chennai main line.

By the end of 1877 the company owned 150 steam locomotives, 391 coaches and 3223 goods wagons.

The southern part of the East Coast State Railway (from Waltair to Vijayawada) was taken over by Madras Railway in 1901. Amongst the constituent railways of Madras Railway were Kolar Goldfields Railway, Nilgiri Mountain Railway and Shornapur Cochin Railway.

The Madras Railway was merged with Southern Mahratta Railway in 1908 to form Madras and Southern Mahratta Railway.

References

Defunct railway companies of India
1845 establishments in British India
1908 disestablishments in India
Madras Presidency
History of Chennai
Railway companies established in 1845
Indian companies established in 1845
Railway companies disestablished in 1908